A-Haunting We Will Go is a 1966 Warner Bros. Looney Tunes cartoon directed by Robert McKimson. The short was released on April 16, 1966, and stars Daffy Duck, Speedy Gonzales and Witch Hazel. As with the other Witch Hazel cartoons, June Foray voices Witch Hazel while Mel Blanc voices Speedy Gonzales, Daffy Duck, and Daffy's nephew.

This is the last Looney Tunes cartoon featuring Witch Hazel, as well as the last Looney Tunes cartoon with June Foray's voice acting in the Golden Age. However, she would reprise her role as Witch Hazel once again in an episode of the 2003 Duck Dodgers series.

Plot 
It is Halloween and Daffy Duck's nephew (essentially a child-sized version of Daffy) goes trick-or-treating as a witch, in the same outfit that Bugs Bunny wore in Broom-Stick Bunny. He soon visits Witch Hazel's house. He runs home screaming after being scared by Witch Hazel's hideous face (however, Witch Hazel's skin is more yellow instead of green). At home, Daffy's nephew tries to explain to his uncle that he saw a witch. Daffy gets angry at his nephew and explains, "There's no such thing as a witch ... She's just a poor old lady trying to get along." He tells him that he will prove it by meeting Witch Hazel.

Back at Witch Hazel's home, Hazel complains, "What am I so happy for? All I do is work over a hot pot, day after day," and that she needs a vacation. However, she must choose someone to take her place. Speedy Gonzales comes and asks for a cup of cheese. Hazel just complains but soon gets an idea. She grabs a special piece of cheese and feeds it to Speedy. Speedy turns into an identical copy of Witch Hazel, and the real Witch Hazel asks him if he can act like her. Speedy, who is quite calm about the transformation, says okay and runs around the house yelling his usual "Ándale, ándale, arriba, arriba, arriba, epa, epa." Witch Hazel says he still acts like himself but it will have to do. She takes off to Hawaii, leaving Speedy to take care of the shop.

Then Daffy comes over, and Speedy welcomes him in. Speedy makes tea out of Witch Hazel's potions, leaving Daffy alone. Daffy, a little frightened, stays in the house stating, "She could be somebody's mother, or father, or something". Witch Speedy gives Daffy tea, turning him into the flower-headed creature from Duck Amuck. Hazel then comes back from Hawaii, and after seeing what Speedy has done, she turns him into a mouse again. She then sees Daffy and gets in a mood for a duck dinner. She then turns Daffy into his old body. Daffy immediately runs away from Hazel, although she lifts him off the ground with the end of her flying broom. Daffy jumps off her broom and parachutes down, but the parachute turns into an anvil. Witch Hazel laughs until she flies into a rock.

Down on the ground, Daffy gets scared of another witch, who turns out to be his nephew in his witch disguise. His nephew asks him if he saw the witch, but Daffy tells him, "She's just an eccentric old lady trying to scare people ... Witchcraft is just a myth, an old superstition." On the way home Daffy turns back into the flower-headed creature again, unbeknownst to his nephew.

Crew 
 Director: Robert McKimson 
 Story: Larz Bourne, Bill Danch, Tedd Pierce
 Animation: Manny Perez, George Grandpre, Warren Batchelder, Bob Matz, Norm McCabe, Don Towsley
 Layout: Dick Ung
 Backgrounds: Tom O'Loughlin
 Film Editor: Al Wahrman
 Additional Voices: June Foray
 Music: Bill Lava
 Voice Characterizations: Mel Blanc
 Produced by: David H. DePatie and Friz Freleng

Production 
The cartoon reuses some animation of Witch Hazel from Broom-Stick Bunny and reuses Daffy as the flower-headed creature from Duck Amuck (both cartoons are directed by Chuck Jones).

References

External links 
 

1966 short films
Looney Tunes shorts
DePatie–Freleng Enterprises short films
1966 animated films
Films directed by Robert McKimson
1960s American animated films
1960s Warner Bros. animated short films
American comedy short films
American films about Halloween
Films about witchcraft
Films scored by William Lava
Daffy Duck films
Speedy Gonzales films
Animated films about mice
1960s English-language films
American animated short films
Films about ducks